HK Malmö is a handball club based in Malmö, Sweden. The club was formed in May 2007 and plays in the highest handball division in Sweden.

The club has quickly established itself at the top of Swedish handball on the men's side

The club has activities at both elite and grass roots level, both adult and youth level, and men's and women's teams. It also has a Para handball and 30 youth teams.

Sports Hall information

Name: – Baltiska Hallen
City: – Malmö
Capacity: – 4000
Address: – Eric Perssons väg 8a, 217 62 Malmö, Sweden

Kits

Team

Current squad 
Squad for the 2019-20 season

Goalkeepers
 16  Oscar Jensen
 12  Erik Helgsten
 18  Anton Hellberg
 1  Dan Beutler
Wingers
LW
 6  Simon Nyberg
 9  Nils Pettersson
 14  Linus Svensson
RW
 17  Johannes Larsson
 21  Hampus Olsson
Line Players
 11  Kassem Awad
 19  Otto Lagerquist
 23  Mattias Kvick

Back Players
LB
 47  Filip Berensen
 22  Viktor Östlund
 25  Anton Blickhammar
CB
 13  Daniel Ekman
 7  Tim Hilding
 3  Arvid Johansson
RB
 10  Magnus Persson
 15  Fredrik Lindahl
 20  Elias Hall

Transfers
Transfers for the 2019-20 season

Joining
  Viktor Östlund (LB) (from  TTH Holstebro)
  Filip Berensen (LB) (from  HK Varberg)
  Daniel Ekman (CB) (from  Eskilstuna Guif)
  Johannes Larsson (RW) (from  IFK Kristianstad)
  Oscar Jensen (GK) (from  OV Helsingborg)
  Anton Hellberg (GK) (from  Hammarby)
  Elias Hall (RB) (from  Kävlinge HK)
  Arvid Johansson (LB) (from  H43)
  Linus Svensson (LW) (from  H43)
  Niklas Mörk (RW) (from  Lugi)
  Dan Beutler (GK) 
Leaving
  Robin Paulsen (to  Skjern Håndbold)
  Dan Beutler (GK) (to  GOG Håndbold) 
  Adam Lönn (LB) (to  TV Bittenfeld) 
  Binai Aziz (CB) (to  Haslum HK)

External links
 
 

Swedish handball clubs
Sport in Malmö
2007 establishments in Sweden
Handball clubs established in 2007